The Maddox Baronetcy, of Wormley in the County of Hertford, was a title in the Baronetage of England. It was created on 11 March 1676 for Benjamin Maddox. The title became extinct on his death in 1716.

Maddox baronets, of Wormley (1676)
Sir Benjamin Maddox, 1st Baronet (–1716)

References

Extinct baronetcies in the Baronetage of England